Land Bank of Taiwan (LBOT) is a wholly state-owned bank in Taiwan (ROC). It was owned by the Taiwan Provincial Government before its downsizing on December 21, 1998, when it was transferred to the jurisdiction of the Executive Yuan.

It is the only bank designated by the ROC government as a specialised bank for handling real estate and agricultural credit. Its objective is to develop national economic construction in coordination with the implementation of the government's housing, agricultural, and land policies.

History
The history of the Land Bank of Taiwan dates from 1945 and the end of World War II. To facilitate the implementation of land policies such as land-rights equalization and the land-to-the-tiller program in Taiwan, the ROC government allocated 60 million dollars from the national treasury and took over the five branches of the Nippon Kangyo Bank (NKB) set up in Taipei, Hsinchu, Taichung, Tainan, and Kaohsiung during Japanese rule. The “Land Bank of Taiwan” was established in accordance with ROC law on 1 September 1946.

In May 1985, the Land Bank of Taiwan became qualified as a juristic person according to Article 52 of the Banking Act; on 21 December 1998, it became a state-run organization upon implementation of the Province Simplification Statute; on 1 July 2003, it was reorganized as the "Land Bank of Taiwan Co., Ltd." On 21 May 2004, it was transformed into a public company to prepare for initial public offering on privatization.

Organisational structure
The LBOT's managerial structure consists of the head office with 23 units, 148 domestic branches (excluding OBU) in Taiwan, and 6 overseas branches and offices.

The Overseas Branches and Offices are LBOT Los Angeles Branch, LBOT New York Branch, LBOT Singapore Branch, LBOT Hong Kong Branch, LBOT Shanghai Representative Office in P.R.C. and LBOT Ho Chi Minh City Representative Office in Vietnam.

LBOT's Shanghai branch officially opened on December 29, 2010. In addition, the LBOT sets up six Regional Centers in the form of a task force.

Employees
At the end of 2008, the number of employees was 5,815 .

Credit ratings
Moody’s  Investors Service, DEC 02 2008: Aa3, Outlook :Stable

Standard & Poor’s,  MAY 20 2009: A−, Outlook :Stable

See also

 Taiwan Land Reform Museum
 List of banks in Taiwan
 Economy of Taiwan
 List of companies of Taiwan